Cryptomyrus is a genus of mormyrid fish native to Gabon.

Species
There are currently two recognized species in this genus:

 Cryptomyrus ogoouensis J. P. Sullivan, Lavoué & C. D. Hopkins, 2016 (Ogooue elephantfish)
 Cryptomyrus ona J. P. Sullivan, Lavoué & C. D. Hopkins, 2016 (Nyanga elephantfish)

References

Mormyridae
 

Ray-finned fish genera